Ferocactus macrodiscus is a species of cactus (family Cactaceae) in the genus Ferocactus from Guanahuato and Oaxaca States,  Mexico. It has a globular body about four inches (ten centimeters) high and up to 18 inches (45 centimeters) wide,  with typically in maturity 13 to 21 vertical ridges or ribs, based on its adherance to the primary Fibonacci  series. It is most noteworthy for its pink, approx. two inch (5 cm) wide  flowers, which have approximately 200 tepals arranged in a continuous spiral series from perfect sepals on the outside gradually morphing into perfect petals near the center.

References

External links
 
 

macrodiscus
Flora of Mexico
Plants described in 1922